Zhang Linlin (born Xiangxiang, June 12, 1933), better known by the Hong Kong stage name Chung Ching, was a popular leading lady of Hong Kong films in the 1950s. After completing 54 films from 1953 to 1967, many of them in the leading role, she retired from film at the height of her career to become well known as a painter using both shui-mo and Western watercolor techniques.

Filmography
Seven Sisters (1953) "七姊妹"	
It Blossoms Again (1954) "再春花" ... Hui Fang	
Blood-Stained Flowers (1954)	"碧血黄花" 	 
Lady Balsam's Conquest (1955)	 "海棠红"	 
What Price Beauty ? (1955)	 "小白菜"	 
Blood Will Tell (1955)	 	"小凤仙续集" 
Beauty of Tokyo (1955)	 "樱都艳迹"	 
The Heroine (1955)	"杨娥" 	 
Over the Rolling Hills (1956)	"那个不多情" 	 
Sweet as a Melon (1956)	 "采西瓜的姑娘"	 
The Story of a Fur Coat (1956)	 "金缕衣"	 
Angel of the Vineyard (1956)	"葡萄仙子" also 葡萄夫人
Madame Butterfly (1956)	 "蝴蝶夫人"	 
Xi Shi (1956)	 "卧薪尝胆"	 
Blind Love (1956)"盲恋"	 	 
Who Isn't Romantic? (1956)"关山行"	 	 
Songs of the Peach Blossom River (1956) "桃花江"as Jin Lirong / Wild Cat	
You Are the Winds of Spring (1957) "春色无边" as Hon May	
Love Fiesta (1957)"飞来艳福"	 	 
The Storm-Tossed Village (1957)	 "风雨桃花村"	 
Corpse-Drivers of Xiangxi (1957)"湘西赶尸记"
Life with Grandma (1957)  "满庭芳"	 
The Nightingale of Alishan (1957) "阿里山之莺" as Fu Ah Na	
Holiday Express (1957)	 "特别快车"	 
Teenagers Folly (1957)	 "郎如春日风"	 
A Perfect Match (1958)	"龙凤姻缘" 	 
Red Lantern (1958) "借红灯"as Jinfeng	
The Blood-Stained Lantern (1958)"血影灯"	 	 
Love at First Sight (1958)"一见钟情"	 	 
A Kiss for Me (1958)	"给我一个吻" 	 
The Flight of the Phoenix (1958)"凤凰于飞" 	 
The Film World's Merry Song (1958)"银海笙歌"	 
The Vengeance of the Vampire (1959)"僵尸复仇"
Day-Time Husband (1959)	 "血洒情花"	 
Lovers in a Sea of Desire (1959)"欲海情花"	 	 
The Mermaid (1959)"美人鱼"	 	 
Princess of a Hundred Flowers (1959) "百花公主"as Ding Ai-Lin/Gao Yue-Ying	
Full of Joy (1959)	 	 "湘女多情" 
Dear Girl, I Love You (1959)	"妹妹我爱你" 	 
Crimes of Passion (1959)"毒蟒情鸳"	 	 
The Lovesick Woman (1959)"私恋"		 	 
The Amorous Pussy-Cat (1960)	"多情的野猫" 	 
Secret Affairs (1960) "入室佳人"
A Challenge of Love (1960)	"情敌" 	 
What Love Achieves (1960)	 	 
The Witch-Girl, He Yue'er (1961)"妖女何月儿"	 	 
The Lovers and the Python (1961)	 	 
Who Is Not Romantic? (Part 2) (1962)	"那个不多情续集" 	 
The Honest Hero and the Faithful Dog (1963)"游侠义犬"	 	 
The Magic Lamp (1964) "宝莲灯"as Qin Guanbao	
The Greatest Love Affair on Earth (1964) "南北喜相逢" as Lo-Pin	
The Better Halves (1964) "鸾凤和鸣" as Hsiao-tsui	
Song of the Waves (1966)"浪淘沙"	 	 
Peach Blossom River (1967)"新桃花江"

References

External links

1933 births
Living people
20th-century Hong Kong actresses
20th-century Chinese painters
20th-century Chinese women artists
People from Xiangxiang